The Bola de Prata (Portuguese for Silver Ball) is a Primeira Liga award for the top scorer. In case two or more players have the same number of goals, the award goes to the footballer with the fewest games played. It was first awarded as a prize in the 1952–53 season by sports newspaper A Bola.

Héctor Yazalde holds the record for most goals in a single season, with 46, achieved in the 1973–74 season. Fernando Peyroteo recorded the highest goals-to-games ratio to win the award, 2.43, in 1937–38.

There have been 52 winners. Seventeen players have won the award in more than one occasion, with Eusébio having the record with seven wins. Eusébio also holds the record for most consecutive wins, with five. Rui Jordão, Paulinho Cascavel and Mário Jardel are the only players to win the award with two clubs, and Cascavel is the only one to achieve it in consecutive seasons.

Winners

Notes

Statistics

Multiple winners

Awards won by nationality

Awards won by club

See also

List of Primeira Liga top scorers

References

Portuguese football trophies and awards
Primeira Liga players
Association football player non-biographical articles
Portugal